Jonathan Vitale (born March 11, 1981 in Canton, Ohio) is a former American rugby union prop. He was a member of the United States national rugby union team that participated in the 2007 Rugby World Cup.

References

1981 births
Living people
Rugby union props
American rugby union players
United States international rugby union players